i.am+ is an American technology company based in Los Angeles, California. The company was founded by musician Will.i.am, an American singer and rapper known for being a member of the Black Eyed Peas, in 2013 with the mission of "creating wearable products that combine fashion and technology." In 2016, i.am+ acquired Israeli machine learning software company Sensiya, now known as over.ai.

Products

i.am+ camera for iPhone 4

In 2012 i.am+ announced a camera accessory for the iPhone 4.

dial 
dial is a SIM-enabled smartwatch currently available in the UK exclusively through Three. Featuring a voice-enabled AI named AneedA, the smartwatch is the first of its kind with a conversational operating system. The dial is also unique in that it does not need to be tethered to a smart phone and can send calls and SMS messages independently. Included with the dial is a music streaming service with over 20 million songs.

EPs 
i.am+ EPs are high-end Bluetooth headphones. The circular and phones form was supposedly designed to echo their namesake vinyl records. The EPs feature a woven fabric cable and a magnetic clip so they can be worn around the neck when not in use.

BUTTONS 
The EPs were replaced with the 2nd generation of bluetooth headphones (now called i.am+ BUTTONS). i.am+ BUTTONS launched in November 2016.

over.ai 
In July 2016, i.am+ acquired Israeli company Sensiya, now over.ai, to continue research and development of their machine learning and natural language understanding technologies.

Wink 
In July 2017, i.am+ purchased Wink, a software and hardware manufacturer, from Flex in a $38.7 million deal.

Earin 
In January 2018 i.am+ attempted to acquire Swedish earbuds startup Earin. The acquisition later fell through for undisclosed reasons.

Omega Voice Assistant 
In October 2018, i.am+ announced a new platform agnostic voice assistant called Omega.

In 2018, Majid Al Futtaim formed a partnership with i.am+ to introduce its omega technology in the Middle east, Asia, and Africa.

Funding 
In November 2017, the company secured $117 million in funding. Prior to this, it had raised $89 million from a group, including Salesforce Ventures.

Controversy 
In 2019, federal government of the United States lodged a lien for alleged non-payment of taxes.

References

Consumer electronics brands
American companies established in 2013